Marie Anne Victoire Pigeon d'Osangis (1724, Paris – 1767, Berlin) was a French mathematician and writer.

She was the daughter of the scientist Jean Pigeon.  In 1744, she eloped with her teacher, mathematician Pierre Le Guay de Prémontval, to Switzerland, where they married, and then to Berlin.  In 1752, she was a teacher of princess Wilhelmina of Hesse-Kassel.

Works
 Le méchaniste (sic) philosophe ou Mémoire contenant plusieurs particularités de la vie et des ouvrages du sieur Jean Pigeon [son père], La Haye, 1750.

References
  Assézat, Œuvres complètes de Diderot. Paris, Garnier, 1875. Vol. 9, p. 77.
 
 

1724 births
1767 deaths
French women mathematicians
18th-century French mathematicians
18th-century French women scientists
18th-century Prussian educators
18th-century Prussian women
18th-century French women